John Lees (17 January 1930 – 14 November 2021) was an English bodybuilder and later a professional wrestler who won Mr. Universe in 1957.

Life and career
Lees was born in Stalybridge in 1930. In retirement, Lees operated a gym called John Lees Fitness Centre in Stalybridge, until it was destroyed by a fire in 2005. He died on 14 November 2021, at the age of 91.

Competitive history
Lees participated in the following bodybuilding competitions:

1949: Mr Britain - HSL, 3rd
1950: Mr Britain - HSL, 3rd
1950: Mr Universe - NABBA, Medium-Tall, 1st
1952: Mr Universe - NABBA, Tall, 2nd
1953: Mr Britain - HSL, Winner
1953: Mr Europe - 4th
1953: Mr Universe - NABBA, Tall, 2nd
1954: Mr Universe - NABBA, Tall, 2nd
1955: Mr Universe - NABBA, Tall, 3rd
1956: Mr Universe - NABBA, Tall, 2nd
1957: Mr Universe - NABBA, Tall, 1st
1957: Mr Universe - NABBA, Overall Winner

References

1930 births
2021 deaths
English bodybuilders
English male wrestlers
People associated with physical culture
People from Stalybridge